Gigi Fernández and Lori McNeil were the defending champions but only Fernández competed that year with Robin White.

Fernández and White lost in the final 6–3, 6–2 against Jana Novotná and Helena Suková.

Seeds
Champion seeds are indicated in bold text while text in italics indicates the round in which those seeds were eliminated.

 Jana Novotná /  Helena Suková (champions)
 Larisa Savchenko /  Natasha Zvereva (semifinals)
 Eva Pfaff /  Elizabeth Smylie (quarterfinals)
 Gigi Fernández /  Robin White (final)

Draw

References
 1988 United Jersey Bank Classic Doubles Draw

WTA New Jersey
1988 WTA Tour
1988 in sports in New Jersey